is a 1963 Japanese youth film directed by Seijun Suzuki for the Nikkatsu Corporation. It is based on the loosely autobiographical novel of the same name by Toko Kon. Ken Yamanouchi stars as Togo Konno, the titular bastard. The film marked Suzuki's first collaboration with production designer Takeo Kimura.

Cast
Ken Yamauchi
Masako Izumi
Midori Tashiro
Chiharu Kuri

Release
The Bastard was released on September 21, 1963.

References

External links
 Japan Foundation notes at Cinefiles
 
 
 The Bastard  at the Japanese Movie Database

1963 films
Films based on Japanese novels
Films directed by Seijun Suzuki
1960s Japanese-language films
Nikkatsu films
Films produced by Masayuki Takagi
1960s Japanese films